Gour or Goud or Gound is a  caste of Jharkhand, Odisha and West Bengal. Locally they are also known as Ahir, Goud Gowala, Gour Gowala. Most of them speak the local form of Bengali language which they lebel as Gourali language and other multilingually speak Ho, Mundari, Kurmali language.

Overview 
The Gour are one of the earliest settlers of Singhbhum district Jharkhand. Traditionally they worked with livestock in a semi-nomadic way of life. As well as they were good warriors. In the matter of fact , the Gour fought with the Kurmi with the help of Kol (Ho) and Munda during their settlement in the river basin of Sankhya, Koel and Karo. After winning the war they placed a landmark stone pillar at Hatnabeda village, adjoining to Kotgarh, near the Saranda forest.

The Gour is divided into four endogamous subdivisions that are Krishna Goud, Nanda Goud, Magadha Goud and Jaharua Goud. Ethnographer like K. S. Singh also include the Andiya, Dhurua, and Bagal into the extended subdivision of Gour. The Gour claim themselves the offshoot of the Gond tribe of central India. Historically, some Singbhum Gours migrated to Dhalbhum of West Bengal and other parts of Eastern India for better land . Now they are found in the river basin of Subarnarekha. There is no record of their ethnic fragmentation before their sanskritization. However their society divided into both totemic and non totemic based lineage that are Nag (Serpent), Kachim (Tortoise), Sal (a fish), Jam Jhodia, Chara (a bird), Bar Behera, Bhaisa, Hathi, Hanumat, Kutar, Kudranosa, Palai and Rout. They use Gop, Gope, Gour, Dandapat, Pradhan, Majhi, Barik, Bera, Giri, Saw, Patra, Behera and Ghosh as surnames.

The staple food of Gours is Marh Bhat (rice with boiled water) and Pakhal Bhat (rice with cold water) and sessional vegetable. They are non vegetarian thus consume egg, fish, meat ( goat, deer, sheep, borha and others except beef). They also consume Hanria (rice beer), Mod ( wine from Mahua flower).

The Gours of Kolhan region are in the social cluster of Ho tribe. And they are classified as Backward Classes in 1980 after representation submitted by Singhbhum Gour Kalyan Samiti to the erstwhile Government of Bihar.

Reference 

Castes
Social groups of Jharkhand
Social groups of Odisha
Social groups of West Bengal